Vonno Lamar Gudger Jr. (April 30, 1919 – August 2, 2004) represented North Carolina's 11th congressional district in the United States House of Representatives from 1977 to 1981.  Gudger, who was born in Asheville, had several degrees from the University of North Carolina, served in the United States Army Air Forces from 1942 to 1945, and subsequently became a lawyer, serving as solicitor for the state from 1952 to 1954.  He was elected to the North Carolina House of Representatives from 1951 to 1952 and a member of the North Carolina Senate from 1971 to 1977 before his election to the federal Congress.  Following an unsuccessful 1980 reelection campaign, he served as a Buncombe County special superior court judge from 1984 to 1989.  He died on August 2, 2004, in Asheville and was buried at Arlington National Cemetery.

External links

Biography, The Biographical Directory of the United States Congress

|-

|-

|-

Burials at Arlington National Cemetery
1919 births
2004 deaths
Democratic Party members of the North Carolina House of Representatives
Democratic Party North Carolina state senators
North Carolina state court judges
Democratic Party members of the United States House of Representatives from North Carolina
Politicians from Asheville, North Carolina
20th-century American politicians
20th-century American judges
United States Army Air Forces personnel of World War II